During the 2006–07 English football season, Accrington Stanley competed in Football League Two.

Season summary
Stanley scored 70 league goals during which they were involved in a relegation battle for most of the season, but a run of 5 wins in their last 9 games allowed them to secure safety in 20th place, their highlight of the season being a 5–0 thumping of then-promotion-favourites Wrexham. More success came in the cups. In Stanley's first ever game in the Football League Cup, third-tier Nottingham Forest were beaten 1–0. This set an away tie to Premier League team Watford, who needed a penalty shootout to eliminate the Lancashire club. The club also performed well in the Football League trophy, reaching the area quarter-finals before being eliminated by Doncaster Rovers.

First-team squad
Squad at end of season

Left club during season

References

Notes

Accrington Stanley F.C. seasons
Accrington Stanley F.C.